Septatorina is a suborder of parasitic alveolates of the phylum Apicomplexa

Taxonomy

There are five superfamilies and one family in this suborder: superfamilies Fusionicae, Gregarinicae, Porosporicae, Stenophoricae and Stylocephaloidea; and family  Blabericolidae.

History

This taxon was created in 1885 by Ray Lankester.

Description

The defining morphological feature of this taxon is the presence of septum dividing the gamont or trophozoite into a protomerite and deutomerite. The septum may not always be visible by light microscopy. Species in this taxon also have an epimerite.

Species in this taxon infect invertebrates and especially arthropods.

References

SAR supergroup suborders
Conoidasida